

Television

Radio

References

ACC Tournament finals
Basketball on NBC
Accmens
ABC Sports
CBS Sports
ACC Tournament finals broadcasters